An Open Secret is a 2014 American documentary film directed by Amy J. Berg exposing child sexual abuse in the film industry in California.

Production history
Berg decided to make the documentary after she was approached by Matthew Valentinas in 2011. Valentinas and Gabe Hoffman wanted to make a film about victims of sexual exploitation. Valentinas said, "We chose Amy because we didn't want it to be exploitative or tabloid. We wanted it to be empowering for the victims." Matthew Valentinas, an entertainment lawyer, came up with the idea when he heard Corey Feldman talking about his sexual abuse as a child actor in a TV interview. Berg's 2006 film Deliver Us from Evil, a documentary on systemic child sexual abuse in the Catholic Church, had been nominated for the Academy Award for Best Documentary Feature.

Synopsis
The documentary follows the stories of five former child actors who were sexually abused by multiple predators. Much of the film focuses on Marc Collins-Rector, subsequently convicted of child sexual abuse, who co-owned and operated Digital Entertainment Network, with Brock Pierce also owning a minor share. DEN produced brief online videos during the early days of the Internet, and was noted for wild parties featuring underage boys at Collins-Rector's house.

The film makes multiple references to director Bryan Singer, who was allegedly at some of the DEN parties, but does not detail allegations against him. A lawsuit alleging that Singer sexually abused Michael Egan as an underage boy was withdrawn during the production of the film. As a result, the film only details allegations made by persons willing to appear on camera.

Among the people interviewed is Vanity Fair journalist John Connolly, who states that an article on pedophilia in Hollywood was dropped at the last minute by Details magazine.

Reception
An Open Secret has an approval rating of 88% on Rotten Tomatoes, based on reviews from 17 critics. On Metacritic, the film has a weighted average score of 66 out of 100 based on reviews from nine critics, indicating "generally favorable reviews".

The Hollywood Reporter wrote that the film offered a "sober look at accusations that lend themselves to sensationalism."

The Los Angeles Times describes the movie as "not the hard-hitting exposé that it aims to be" but as "an unsettling look at pedophilia in Hollywood".

The New York Times wrote that the "topic deserves a tenacious call for answers" and hoped for "further aggressive reporting" which they missed in the movie, when Berg linked Martin Weiss "to a string of other men" but only presenting "a secretly taped conversation and some menacing music".

Flavorwire claims that "the film feels less shocking as a cult-of-celebrity document and more just quietly horrifying, as it details the trauma and the abuse of power inflicted on young men with stars in their eyes."

Indiewire described the documentary as "an incisive and utterly unflinching look at a subject too rarely scrutinized."

Controversy
On July 30, 2015, Deadline Hollywood reported that the producers of An Open Secret accused Berg of not supporting the film. Producers Gabe Hoffman and Matthew Valentinas filed an arbitration against Berg for allegedly delivering the movie late and incomplete, and failing to promote it. Hoffman's Esponda Productions claimed that Berg failed to get the proper release forms from some of the interviewees and that this error almost caused the film to miss its premiere at Doc NYC.

Another controversy arose when the Huffington Post reported that two of the movie's subjects, Evan Henzi and Chris Turcotte, had called the documentary "unfair" and "dishonest". In another Huffington Post article, Turcotte said that Berg omitted portions of his interview from the movie, detailing that Collins-Rector had sex at the estate with underage teens in private, but not during sex parties.

These controversies appear to be substantiated in Michael Egan's sexual abuse claims against Bryan Singer and three others. "His cases against the four men began to collapse in May 2014, just a month after they were filed, when his prior contradictory statements came to light". Egan's attorneys, Jeff Herman and Mark Gallagher, later settled with Garth Ancier and David Neuman and issued an apology that called the allegations "untrue" and paid a seven-figure settlement to both. Neither Singer nor Gary Goddard received an apology because they didn't file countersuits as Ancier and Neuman had, although "Egan’s cases against all four were framed in virtually identical complaints and centered on the same purported events, timeframes, locations and supposed trip(s) to Hawaii".

The documentary previously named all four men in connection with the 2014 lawsuits, but was edited to remove those references.

Release
An Open Secret initially had a limited theatrical release, but producers were encouraged about its commercial potential because a pirated version was viewed 900,000 times. However, it received no television deal or video-on-demand distribution. According to Gabe Hoffman, who financed the film: "We got zero Hollywood offers to distribute the film. Not even one. Literally no offers for any price whatsoever." On October 12, 2017, Hoffman and Valentinas released the film for nine days on Vimeo "to commemorate serial predator Harvey Weinstein finally being exposed." It went viral, and free viewing was then extended for a longer period due to the interest shown in the film, with over 3 million viewings garnered on various social media platforms in the first two weeks.

At the time of its Vimeo release, the producers said they were seeking further distribution of the documentary. It has not been released to home video.

References

External links
 
 
 

2014 films
2014 documentary films
American documentary films
Child sexual abuse in the United States
Documentary films about pedophilia
Documentary films about child abuse
Documentary films about Hollywood, Los Angeles
Documentary films about crime in the United States
Films directed by Amy J. Berg
Film controversies
Obscenity controversies in film
2010s English-language films
2010s American films